Highest Traditions: The History of No. 2 Squadron, RAAF is a 1995 book by John Bennett. It is a history of No. 2 Squadron of the Royal Australian Air Force (RAAF). It covers the period from its formation in 1916 during World War I as part of the Australian Flying Corps, the transition to the RAAF, service during World War II and postwar conflicts in Asia, to its disbanding in 1982 after the Vietnam War.

References

1995 non-fiction books
Royal Australian Air Force